Two-leaved Solomon's seal is a common name for several plants and may refer to:

Maianthemum canadense, native to Canada and the northeastern United States
Maianthemum dilatatum, native to western North America and Asia